Count William Otto of Nassau-Siegen (23 June 1607 – 14 August 1641), official titles: Graf zu Nassau, Katzenelnbogen, Vianden und Diez, Herr zu Beilstein, was a count from the House of Nassau-Siegen, a cadet branch of the Ottonian Line of the House of Nassau. He served as an officer in the Swedish Army.

Biography
William Otto was born at Dillenburg Castle on 23 June 1607 as the third son of Count John VII ‘the Middle’ of Nassau-Siegen and his second wife, Duchess Margaret of Schleswig-Holstein-Sonderburg. William Otto studied in Kassel in 1622 together with his elder brother George Frederick.

The will and testament of Count John VII ‘the Middle’ of 1621 bequeathed John Maurice and his younger brothers from their father’s second marriage the district of Freudenberg, some villages in the Haingericht and a third part of the administration of the city of Siegen. His older brothers John Maurice and George Frederick did not.

During the Thirty Years’ War William Otto served in the Swedish Army under Duke Bernhard of Saxe-Weimar. When the latter died in 1639, he bequeathed to William Otto a riding horse and 10,000 Rhineland Thalers. William Otto occupied Kreuznach and Bingen in 1639 and Braunfels in 1640. He was killed in a cavalry battle near Wolfenbüttel on 14 August 1641, and was buried in Kassel on 16 September 1641.

William Otto was the only one of the many sons of Count John VII ‘the Middle’ who never served the Dutch Republic.

Ancestors

Notes

References

Sources
 
 
 
 
 
 
 
 
 
 
  (1979). "Genealogische gegevens". In:  (red.), Nassau en Oranje in de Nederlandse geschiedenis (in Dutch). Alphen aan den Rijn: A.W. Sijthoff. p. 40–44, 224–228. .
 
 
  (1882). Het vorstenhuis Oranje-Nassau. Van de vroegste tijden tot heden (in Dutch). Leiden: A.W. Sijthoff/Utrecht: J.L. Beijers.

External links

 Nassau. In: Medieval Lands. A prosopography of medieval European noble and royal families, compiled by Charles Cawley.
 Nassau Part 5. In: An Online Gotha, by Paul Theroff.

1607 births
1641 deaths
German Calvinist and Reformed Christians
German military officers
German people of the Thirty Years' War
William Otto of Nassau-Siegen
Military personnel of the Thirty Years' War
People from Dillenburg
Swedish military officers
17th-century German people
Military personnel from Hesse